Basil the Blessed (known also as Basil, fool for Christ; Basil, Wonderworker of Moscow; or Blessed Basil of Moscow, fool for Christ , Vasily Blazhenny) is a Russian Orthodox saint of the type known as yurodivy or "holy fool".

Life

He was born to serfs in December 1468 at the portico of the Epiphany Cathedral at Yelokhovo (now in Moscow). His father was named Jacob and his mother Anna.

Originally an apprentice shoemaker, he went to Moscow when he was sixteen. There he helped those who were ashamed to ask for alms, but were in need of help. He adopted an eccentric lifestyle of shoplifting and giving to the poor to shame the miserly and help those in need.  He went naked and weighed himself down with chains.  He rebuked Ivan the Terrible for not paying attention in church. Basil was said to have the gift of prophecy.

When he died on August 2, 1552 or 1557, St. Macarius, Metropolitan of Moscow, served his funeral with many clergy. He is buried in St. Basil's Cathedral in Moscow, which was commissioned by Ivan for commemoration of his conquest of Kazan' and was named for the saint later. Basil was formally canonised in 1588.  His feast day is celebrated on August 2 (August 15, N.S.).

See also
 
 Blessed John of Moscow the Fool-For-Christ
 Foolishness for Christ
 Hell icon
 John the Hairy
 Sign of contradiction
 Xenia of Saint Petersburg

Citations

General sources 
 Attwater, Donald and Catherine Rachel John. The Penguin Dictionary of Saints. 3rd edition. New York: Penguin Books, 1993. .

External links

 St Basil of Moscow Orthodox Icon and Synaxarion
 The Holy and Blessed Basil, "Fool for Christ" of Moscow from the Prologue from Ohrid

1460s births
1550s deaths
15th-century Eastern Orthodox Christians
15th-century Russian people
16th-century Christian saints
16th-century Eastern Orthodox Christians
16th-century Russian people
Russian saints
Yurodivy